Graham Lake (Yellow Dog Lodge) Water Aerodrome  is located on Graham Lake, near the Yellow Dog Lodge, approximately  north northeast of Yellowknife, Northwest Territories, Canada. Permanent structures on the lease include, 2656 sq ft main lodge, 3 cabins and a combination workshop - storage building. No aviation fuel or oil is kept on site. There are 3 docks.  The main dock and marina is on Graham Lake and the other 2 docks are on Duncan Lake.  Both Lakes are 160 metres apart and are connected by a small stream. The water aerodrome marina can accommodate light aircraft on floats or skis.  No landing strip is located on site.

Yellow Dog Lodge is a commercial sport fishing camp operating between June and October,  February to April. Satellite internet communications and Food service is available during the operating seasons. 

The nearest commercial airport is Yellowknife, Canada:  YZF, located 35 statute miles south, south west of Graham Lake. Fuel may be purchased at Yellowknife.

References

Registered aerodromes in the North Slave Region
Seaplane bases in the Northwest Territories